Samuel Barker,  (May 25, 1839 – June 26, 1915) was a Canadian parliamentarian and lawyer.

Barker was first elected to the House of Commons of Canada as the Conservative Member of Parliament for Hamilton, Ontario in the 1900 federal election after an unsuccessful attempt four years earlier. He was re-elected as the MP for Hamilton East in 1904 and remained in office for a total of almost fifteen years before dying in office at the age of 76 after winning four consecutive elections.

He was appointed to the Queen's Privy Council for Canada on February 28, 1913 on the recommendation of Prime Minister Robert Borden.

References

1839 births
1915 deaths
Members of the House of Commons of Canada from Ontario
Members of the King's Privy Council for Canada
Conservative Party of Canada (1867–1942) MPs